"Save It for Me" is a song written by Bob Gaudio and Bob Crewe. A song recorded in 1964 by The Four Seasons for their Rag Doll album, it was released as the follow-up record to the album's title song, which had hit the #1 position on the Billboard Hot 100 singles chart in July 1964. "Save It for Me" was also a success for the quartet, reaching the #10 position on the Billboard singles chart.

Billboard described the song as a "medium tempo ballad, featuring ethereal organ support," calling it a "smasheroo."  Cash Box said it has "a wild 'Telstar' instrumentation" and "quite a sound."

References

Songs written by Bob Gaudio
The Four Seasons (band) songs
1964 singles
Songs written by Bob Crewe
RPM Top Singles number-one singles
Song recordings produced by Bob Crewe
1964 songs
Philips Records singles